Callidina is a genus of freshwater rotifers in the family Adinetidae.

References

External links 

 
 Video of Callidina multispinosa at youtube

Bdelloidea
Rotifer genera
Taxa named by Christian Gottfried Ehrenberg